In mathematics, a q-analog of a theorem, identity or expression is a generalization involving a new parameter q that returns the original theorem, identity or expression in the limit as .  Typically, mathematicians are interested in q-analogs that arise naturally, rather than in arbitrarily contriving q-analogs of known results.  The earliest q-analog studied in detail is the basic hypergeometric series, which was introduced in the 19th century.

q-analogs are most frequently studied in the mathematical fields of combinatorics and special functions.
q-analogs find applications in a number of areas, including the study of fractals and multi-fractal measures, and expressions for the entropy of chaotic dynamical systems. The relationship to fractals and dynamical systems results from the fact that many fractal patterns have the symmetries of Fuchsian groups in general (see, for example Indra's pearls and the Apollonian gasket) and the modular group in particular. The connection passes through hyperbolic geometry and ergodic theory, where the elliptic integrals and modular forms play a prominent role; the q-series themselves are closely related to elliptic integrals.

q-analogs also appear in the study of quantum groups and in q-deformed superalgebras. The connection here is similar, in that much of string theory is set in the language of Riemann surfaces, resulting in connections to elliptic curves, which in turn relate to q-series.

"Classical" q-theory
Classical q-theory begins with the q-analogs of the nonnegative integers.  The equality

suggests that we define the q-analog of n, also known as the q-bracket or q-number of n, to be

By itself, the choice of this particular q-analog among the many possible options is unmotivated.  However, it appears naturally in several contexts.  For example, having decided to use [n]q as the q-analog of n, one may define the q-analog of the factorial, known as the q-factorial, by

 

This q-analog appears naturally in several contexts.  Notably, while n! counts the number of permutations of length n, [n]q! counts permutations while keeping track of the number of inversions.  That is, if inv(w) denotes the number of inversions of the permutation w and Sn denotes the set of permutations of length n, we have

The q-factorial also has a concise definition in terms of the q-Pochhammer symbol, a basic building-block of all q-theories:

From the q-factorials, one can move on to define the q-binomial coefficients, also known as Gaussian coefficients, Gaussian polynomials, or Gaussian binomial coefficients:

The q-exponential is defined as:

q-trigonometric functions, along with a q-Fourier transform have been defined in this context.

Combinatorial q-analogs
The Gaussian coefficients count subspaces of a finite vector space.  Let q be the number of elements in a finite field.  (The number q is then a power of a prime number, so using the letter q is especially appropriate.)  Then the number of k-dimensional subspaces of the n-dimensional vector space over the q-element field equals 

Letting q approach 1, we get the binomial coefficient

or in other words, the number of k-element subsets of an n-element set.

Thus, one can regard a finite vector space as a q-generalization of a set, and the subspaces as the q-generalization of the subsets of the set.  This has been a fruitful point of view in finding interesting new theorems.  For example, there are q-analogs of Sperner's theorem and Ramsey theory.

Cyclic sieving

Let q = (e2i/n)d be the d-th power of a primitive n-th root of unity. Let C be a cyclic group of order n generated by an element c. Let X be the set of k-element subsets of the n-element set {1, 2, ..., n}. The group C has a canonical action on X  given by sending c to the cyclic permutation (1, 2, ..., n). Then the number of fixed points of cd on X is equal to

q → 1 

This can be formalized in the field with one element, which recovers combinatorics as linear algebra over the field with one element: for example, Weyl groups are simple algebraic groups over the field with one element.

Applications in the physical sciences
q-analogs are often found in exact solutions of many-body problems. In such cases, the  limit usually corresponds to relatively simple dynamics, e.g., without nonlinear interactions, while  gives insight into the complex nonlinear regime with feedbacks.

An example from atomic physics is the model of molecular condensate creation from  an ultra cold fermionic atomic gas during a sweep of an external magnetic field through the Feshbach resonance. This process is described by a model with a q-deformed version of the SU(2) algebra of operators, and its solution is described by q-deformed exponential and binomial distributions.

See also

 List of q-analogs
 Stirling number
 Young tableau

References
Andrews, G. E.,  Askey, R. A. & Roy, R. (1999), Special Functions, Cambridge University Press, Cambridge.
 Gasper, G. & Rahman, M.  (2004), Basic Hypergeometric Series, Cambridge University Press, .
 Ismail, M. E. H. (2005), Classical and Quantum Orthogonal Polynomials in One Variable,  Cambridge University Press.
Koekoek, R.  & Swarttouw, R. F. (1998), The Askey-scheme of hypergeometric orthogonal polynomials and its q-analogue, 98-17, Delft University of Technology, Faculty of Information Technology and Systems, Department of Technical Mathematics and Informatics.

External links

 q-analog from MathWorld
 q-bracket from MathWorld
 q-factorial from MathWorld
 q-binomial coefficient from MathWorld

Combinatorics